Mandorva Rajputs (Sainik Kshatriya) and also called Rajputs of Mandore is a distinctive ethnic group from Marwar, Rajasthan.

References

Social groups of Rajasthan